Steenstrupbreen is a glacier in Nathorst Land at Spitsbergen, Svalbard. It has a length of about 8.5 kilometers, and is situated northeast of the valley of Steenstrupdalen. The glacier is named after Danish geologist and Arctic explorer Knud Johannes Vogelius Steenstrup. The mountain of Marlowfjellet separates Steenstrupbreen from Sysselmannbreen.

References

Glaciers of Spitsbergen